Rukuhia is a rural community in the Waipa District and Waikato region of New Zealand's North Island.

It is located just south of the Hamilton suburb of Glenview, west of the Waikato District town of Tamahere and north of the Waipa towns of Ōhaupō and Te Awamutu, on State Highway 3.

The area includes several farms on the flat between the Rukuhia Swamp and the Waikato River, and the Hamilton Airport industrial area.

Rukuhia translates as gathered together, submerged or dived for.

The Rukuhia School First World War Memorial was unveiled in June 1923, on the sixth anniversary of the Battle of Messines. It is a tribute to the 22 men from Rukuhia who served in World War I, including the nine who were killed or who died of wounds, and nine others who were wounded but survived. The memorial was rededicated on Armistice Day in 2003.

The Rukuhia railway station was a station on the North Island Main Trunk in New Zealand, established during the extension of the railway line in the 1870s. Tests in 1981 found that the track deformed by about 12mm each time a train went over it, due to the peat swamp.

Demographics
The SA1 area is part of the larger Lake Cameron statistical area.

Rukuhia had a population of 159 at the 2018 New Zealand census, an increase of 27 people (20.5%) since the 2013 census, and an increase of 36 people (29.3%) since the 2006 census. There were 54 households, comprising 87 males and 72 females, giving a sex ratio of 1.21 males per female. The median age was 36.3 years (compared with 37.4 years nationally), with 30 people (18.9%) aged under 15 years, 33 (20.8%) aged 15 to 29, 75 (47.2%) aged 30 to 64, and 18 (11.3%) aged 65 or older.

Ethnicities were 88.7% European/Pākehā, 13.2% Māori, 1.9% Pacific peoples, and 1.9% Asian. People may identify with more than one ethnicity.

Although some people chose not to answer the census's question about religious affiliation, 47.2% had no religion, 35.8% were Christian, 1.9% were Hindu and 1.9% had other religions.

Of those at least 15 years old, 45 (34.9%) people had a bachelor's or higher degree, and 24 (18.6%) people had no formal qualifications. The median income was $38,900, compared with $31,800 nationally. 24 people (18.6%) earned over $70,000 compared to 17.2% nationally. The employment status of those at least 15 was that 72 (55.8%) people were employed full-time, 18 (14.0%) were part-time, and 3 (2.3%) were unemployed.

Lake Cameron statistical area

Lake Cameron had a population of 1,479 at the 2018 New Zealand census, an increase of 201 people (15.7%) since the 2013 census, and an increase of 309 people (26.4%) since the 2006 census. There were 465 households, comprising 804 males and 675 females, giving a sex ratio of 1.19 males per female. The median age was 36.0 years (compared with 37.4 years nationally), with 291 people (19.7%) aged under 15 years, 351 (23.7%) aged 15 to 29, 660 (44.6%) aged 30 to 64, and 177 (12.0%) aged 65 or older.

Ethnicities were 85.6% European/Pākehā, 10.1% Māori, 1.0% Pacific peoples, 8.9% Asian, and 2.0% other ethnicities. People may identify with more than one ethnicity.

The percentage of people born overseas was 21.1, compared with 27.1% nationally.

Although some people chose not to answer the census's question about religious affiliation, 48.1% had no religion, 38.3% were Christian, 2.4% were Hindu, 1.8% were Muslim, 0.4% were Buddhist and 2.0% had other religions.

Of those at least 15 years old, 336 (28.3%) people had a bachelor's or higher degree, and 159 (13.4%) people had no formal qualifications. The median income was $37,100, compared with $31,800 nationally. 264 people (22.2%) earned over $70,000 compared to 17.2% nationally. The employment status of those at least 15 was that 636 (53.5%) people were employed full-time, 195 (16.4%) were part-time, and 24 (2.0%) were unemployed.

Education

The school opened in 1907.

References

Waipa District
Populated places in Waikato
Populated places on the Waikato River